This is a list of 294 species in Tachys, a genus of ground beetles in the family Carabidae.

Tachys species

 Tachys abruptus Darlington, 1934 c g
 Tachys aeneipennis Motschulsky, 1862 i c g
 Tachys aequinoctialis (Motschulsky, 1855) c g
 Tachys albipes Leconte, 1863
 Tachys algiricus (Lucas, 1846) c g
 Tachys ambulatus Darlington, 1962 c g
 Tachys androyanus (Jeannel, 1946) c g
 Tachys angustulus Reitter, 1899 c g
 Tachys apex Darlington, 1962 c g
 Tachys arcanicola Blackburn, 1878 i c g
 Tachys arculus Fauvel, 1882 c g
 Tachys argentinicus Csiki, 1928 c g
 Tachys artensis Montrouzier, 1860
 Tachys asemus (Basilewsky, 1968) c g
 Tachys assamicus (Jedlicka, 1964) c g
 Tachys atamuradovi Kryzhanovskij & Mikhailov, 1987 c g
 Tachys atomarius Wollaston, 1867 c g
 Tachys atomus Blackburn, 1878 i c g
 Tachys atratus A.Costa, 1883 c g
 Tachys atridermis Sloane, 1921 c g
 Tachys austinicus Casey, 1918
 Tachys australicus Sloane, 1896 c g
 Tachys avius Darlington, 1962 c g
 Tachys baldiensis Blackburn, 1891 c g
 Tachys barbieri Straneo, 1953 c g
 Tachys bathyglyptus Andrewes, 1925 c g
 Tachys beatus Darlington, 1962 c g
 Tachys beaumonti Casey, 1918 c g
 Tachys bicoloratus Burgeon, 1935 c g
 Tachys bistriatus (Duftschmid, 1812) c g
 Tachys blackburni Sloane, 1921 c g
 Tachys blemoides (Jeannel, 1946) c g
 Tachys bloetei Andrewes, 1930 c g
 Tachys bolellus Darlington, 1962 c g
 Tachys bolus Darlington, 1962 c g
 Tachys bonariensis Steinheil, 1869 c g
 Tachys borkuensis (Bruneau de Miré, 1952) c g
 Tachys bouchardi Andrewes, 1931 c g
 Tachys brachys Andrewes, 1925 c g
 Tachys bradycellinus Hayward, 1900 i c g
 Tachys bredoi (Basilewsky, 1953) c g
 Tachys brevicornis Chaudoir, 1846
 Tachys brunneus Andrewes, 1925 c g
 Tachys brunniceps Andrewes, 1930 c g
 Tachys bryanti Lindroth, 1966 i c g
 Tachys caffer Péringuey, 1896 c g
 Tachys caheni (Basilewsky, 1972) c g
 Tachys caledonicus Csiki, 1928 c g
 Tachys callipygus (Boheman, 1858) c g
 Tachys cameroni Andrewes, 1925 c g
 Tachys captus Blackburn, 1888 c g
 Tachys cardioderus Chaudoir, 1850 c g
 Tachys cardoni Andrewes, 1925 c g
 Tachys carib Darlington, 1936 c g
 Tachys carinulatus Sloane, 1921 c g
 Tachys caspius Kolenati, 1845 c g
 Tachys castaneicolor Bates, 1882 c g
 Tachys centralis J.sahlberg, 1900
 Tachys centriustatus Reitter, 1894
 Tachys centromaculatus Wollaston, 1864 c g
 Tachys chiriquinus Bates, 1882 c g
 Tachys cinctus Putzeys, 1875 c g
 Tachys collardi (Basilewsky, 1955) c g
 Tachys colonicus Casey, 1918 c g
 Tachys columbiensis Hayward, 1900 i c g
 Tachys corax Leconte, 1852
 Tachys coriaceus Broun, 1908 c g
 Tachys crypticola (Britton, 1960) c g
 Tachys cubax Darlington, 1934 c g
 Tachys curtulus (Basilewsky, 1953) c g
 Tachys curvans Bates, 1882
 Tachys cycloderus Bates, 1871 c g
 Tachys cyprius Coulon, 2004 c g
 Tachys delamarei (Jeannel, 1962) c g
 Tachys delicatus Andrewes, 1925 c g
 Tachys dentatus Andrewes, 1925 c g
 Tachys descarpentriesi (Bruneau de Miré, 1965) c g
 Tachys devroeyi Burgeon
 Tachys diaphanus Casey, 1918
 Tachys dimediatus Motschulsky, 1849 c g
 Tachys dimidiatus Motschulsky, 1849 g
 Tachys diminutus Bates, 1871 c g
 Tachys diploharpinus Bates, 1878 c g
 Tachys discipennis Fauvel, 1903
 Tachys dives Péringuey, 1926 c
 Tachys dominicanus Darlington, 1934 c g
 Tachys dorsalis Motschulsky, 1851 c g
 Tachys dostali Baehr, 2014 c g
 Tachys dromioides Bates, 1871 c g
 Tachys dzosonicus Pawlowski, 1974 c g
 Tachys ectromioides Sloane, 1896 c g
 Tachys edax Leconte, 1852
 Tachys ellenbergeri (Bruneau de Miré, 1964) c g
 Tachys elongatulus (Dejean, 1831) c g
 Tachys enormis (Dostal, 2015) c g
 Tachys erwini Reichardt, 1976 c g
 Tachys euryodes Bates, 1892 c g
 Tachys excisicollis Baehr, 2012 c g
 Tachys exochrias Darlington, 1962 c g
 Tachys fasciatus (Motschulsky, 1851) c g
 Tachys federicae Baehr, 2016 c g
 Tachys filax Darlington, 1934 c g
 Tachys flavax Darlington, 1962 c g
 Tachys flavicollis Motschulsky, 1862 c g
 Tachys fortestriatus Baehr, 2003 c g
 Tachys fortunatus Machado, 1989 c g
 Tachys frischi Coulon & Felix, 2009
 Tachys fulvicollis (Dejean, 1831) c g
 Tachys fumax Darlington, 1962 c g
 Tachys gilvus Schaum, 1863 c g
 Tachys gracchus Andrewes, 1935 c g
 Tachys gratus Péringuey, 1896 c
 Tachys guangxicus (Deuve & Tian, 2010) c g
 Tachys gyotokuensis Tanaka, 1956 c g
 Tachys halophilus Lindroth, 1966 i c g
 Tachys haywardi Wickham, 1913 c g
 Tachys holmi (Basilewsky, 1963) c g
 Tachys hyalinus Casey, 1918 i c g
 Tachys hydrophilus (Germain, 1906) c g
 Tachys impictus Andrewes, 1925 c g
 Tachys impressipennis Motschulsky, 1859 c g
 Tachys impressus Motschulsky, 1851 c g
 Tachys incertus Andrewes, 1925 c g
 Tachys infuscatus Blackburn, 1888 c g
 Tachys intermedius Baehr, 2012 c g
 Tachys iridipennis Chaudoir, 1876 c g
 Tachys jeannei Coulon, 2004 c g
 Tachys joannae (Basilewsky, 1962) c g
 Tachys jucundulus Péringuey, 1908 c g
 Tachys kabylianus Puel, 1935 c g
 Tachys kahuzianus (Basilewsky, 1953) c g
 Tachys kaorutanakai Habu, 1977 c g
 Tachys koizumii Habu, 1961 c g
 Tachys koreanorum Pawlowski, 1974 c g
 Tachys laevigatus (Boheman, 1858) c g
 Tachys laevus (Say, 1823) c g
 Tachys lamottei (Bruneau de Miré, 1964) c g
 Tachys languidus Andrewes, 1925 c g
 Tachys latalatus Csiki, 1928 c g
 Tachys leleupi (Basilewsky, 1953) c g
 Tachys lenkoranus Csiki, 1928 c g
 Tachys leptocerus Chaudoir, 1876 c g
 Tachys leytensis (Baehr, 2016) c g
 Tachys limbatellus Bates, 1884 c g
 Tachys lindi Blackburn, 1888 c g
 Tachys lissonotus Andrewes, 1925 c g
 Tachys litoralis Casey, 1884 i c g
 Tachys lividus (Bates, 1871) c g
 Tachys longulus Andrewes, 1925 c g
 Tachys lugubris Motschulsky, 1862 c g
 Tachys lusciosus Antoine, 1943
 Tachys luscus Darlington, 1962 c g
 Tachys macleayi Sloane, 1896 c g
 Tachys macrops Baehr, 2012 c g
 Tachys mameti Alluaud, 1933 c g
 Tachys marggii Kirschenhofer, 1986 c g
 Tachys marri Baehr, 1987 c g
 Tachys masculus Darlington, 1962 c g
 Tachys massauxi (Basilewsky, 1955) c g
 Tachys mastersi Sloane, 1921 c g
 Tachys micros (Fischer von Waldheim, 1828) c g
 Tachys microscopicus (Bates, 1873) c g
 Tachys minusculus (Motschulsky, 1862)
 Tachys minutissimus (R.F.Sahlberg, 1847) c
 Tachys mirandus Coulon & Wrase, 2009
 Tachys mirei (Basilewsky, 1968) c g
 Tachys misellus Laferte-Senectere, 1841
 Tachys mitchelli Sloane, 1895 c g
 Tachys moira (Erwin, 1984)
 Tachys monostictus Bates, 1871 c g
 Tachys mordax Leconte, 1852
 Tachys mulwalensis Sloane, 1900 c g
 Tachys mus Andrewes, 1925 c g
 Tachys myrmecophilus (Jeannel, 1946) c g
 Tachys nanniscus Péringuey, 1896 c g
 Tachys naraensis Ueno, 1953 c g
 Tachys nephelodes Andrewes, 1930 c g
 Tachys niger (Jeannel, 1953) c g
 Tachys nitmiluki (Giachino, 2003) c g
 Tachys nympha (Erwin, 1984)
 Tachys oahuensis Blackburn, 1878 i c g
 Tachys oblitus Casey, 1918 i c g b
 Tachys obtusiusculus (Jeannel, 1941) c g
 Tachys ochrias Andrewes, 1925 c g
 Tachys ochrioides Darlington, 1962 c g
 Tachys olemartini Kirschenhofer, 1986 c g
 Tachys opalescens Andrewes, 1925 c g
 Tachys orphninus Andrewes, 1925 c g
 Tachys otini (Antoine, 1944)
 Tachys pallidus Chaudoir, 1868 i c g b
 Tachys pallorus Kopecky in Löbl & Smetana, 2003 c g
 Tachys palustris Reitter, 1894
 Tachys panamensis Casey, 1918 c g
 Tachys particula Andrewes, 1936 c g
 Tachys paulax Darlington, 1934 c g
 Tachys pharao Schatzmayr & Koch, 1934 c g
 Tachys piceolus Laferte-Senectere, 1841
 Tachys plagiatus Putzeys, 1875 c g
 Tachys pliginskii Solodovnikov, 2001 c g
 Tachys politissimus Baehr, 2014 c g
 Tachys potomaca (Erwin, 1981) i b
 Tachys potomacus (Erwin, 1981) c g
 Tachys prionotus Andrewes, 1936 c g
 Tachys privus Darlington, 1962 c g
 Tachys prolixus Bates, 1892 c g
 Tachys proximus Say, 1823
 Tachys pseudolusciosus Coulon, 2004 c g
 Tachys pseudosericeus Kirschenhofer, 1986 c g
 Tachys pujoli (Bruneau de Miré, 1964) c g
 Tachys pulchellus Laferte-Senectere, 1841
 Tachys pumilus (Dejean, 1831) i c g b
 Tachys pusillimus Péringuey, 1896 c g
 Tachys quadrillum Schaum, 1860
 Tachys queenslandicus Sloane, 1903 c g
 Tachys rambai Jedlicka, 1966 c g
 Tachys rapoporti (Jeannel, 1962)
 Tachys rectangulus Notman, 1919 i c g
 Tachys rhodeanus Casey, 1918 i c g b
 Tachys ridiculus (L.Schaufuss, 1879)
 Tachys riedeli Baehr, 2014 c g
 Tachys rufotestaceus Hayward, 1900
 Tachys sagax Casey, 1918 i c g
 Tachys schuberti Jedlicka, 1968 c g
 Tachys scitulus Leconte, 1848 i c g b
 Tachys scutellaris Stephens, 1828 c g
 Tachys sellatus Fairmaire, 1892 c g
 Tachys sequax Leconte, 1848
 Tachys sericans Bates, 1873 c g
 Tachys sericeus Motschulsky, 1851 c g
 Tachys serra Darlington, 1962 c g
 Tachys serratus Andrewes, 1925 c g
 Tachys serrula Darlington, 1962 c g
 Tachys sexguttatus Fairmaire, 1849
 Tachys shahinei Schatzmayr & Koch, 1934 c g
 Tachys shirazi Jedlicka, 1968 c g
 Tachys sibling Darlington, 1962 c g
 Tachys similis Blackburn, 1888 c g
 Tachys simulator Coulon, 2004 c g
 Tachys spadix Casey, 1918 i c g
 Tachys striax Darlington, 1934 c g
 Tachys subangulatus Bates, 1871 c g
 Tachys subbrunneus Darlington, 1962 c g
 Tachys sublobatus Darlington, 1962 c g
 Tachys suboculatus (Basilewsky, 1958) c g
 Tachys sudanicus (Basilewsky, 1948) c g
 Tachys suensoni Kirschenhofer, 1986 c g
 Tachys sundaicus Andrewes, 1925 c g
 Tachys suturifer Reitter, 1884 c g
 Tachys sydneyensis Sloane, 1923 c g
 Tachys szekessyi Jedlicka, 1968 c g
 Tachys tantillus Motschulsky, 1862
 Tachys tenuiserra Darlington, 1962 c g
 Tachys terra (Erwin, 1984)
 Tachys testaceus (Basilewsky, 1953) c
 Tachys tetraphacus Bedel, 1896 c g
 Tachys tienmushaniensis Kirschenhofer, 1986 c g
 Tachys torretassoi Schatzmayr & Koch, 1934 c g
 Tachys transcaucasicus Coulon, 2004 c g
 Tachys translucens Darlington, 1937 i c g
 Tachys transumbratus Bates, 1892 c g
 Tachys transversicollis (W.J.Macleay, 1871)
 Tachys trechoderus Coulon, 2004 c g
 Tachys trechulus Darlington, 1936 c g
 Tachys troglocola (Deuve & Tian, 2010) c g
 Tachys troglophilus Ueno, 1953 c g
 Tachys tropicalis Baehr, 2012 c g
 Tachys tropicus (Nietner, 1858) c g
 Tachys truncatus (Nietner, 1858) c g
 Tachys turkestanicus Csiki, 1928
 Tachys ucayali (Erwin, 1984)
 Tachys uelensis Burgeon, 1935 c g
 Tachys uenoianus Habu, 1974 c g
 Tachys umbripennis Chaudoir, 1868 i c g
 Tachys uniformis Blackburn, 1888 c g
 Tachys vandeli (Mateu & Colas, 1954) c g
 Tachys vandepolli (Bruneau de Miré, 1964) c g
 Tachys varsavianorum Pawlowski, 1974 c g
 Tachys ventricosus Leconte, 1863
 Tachys venustus Andrewes, 1936 c g
 Tachys vernilis Casey, 1918 i c g
 Tachys vibex Kopecky in Löbl & Smetana, 2003 c g
 Tachys vietnami Jedlicka, 1968 c g
 Tachys vilis Andrewes, 1925 c g
 Tachys virgo Leconte, 1852
 Tachys vittiger Leconte, 1852
 Tachys vorax Leconte, 1852
 Tachys windsorensis Baehr, 1991 c g
 Tachys xanthochrous Chaudoir, 1876 c g
 Tachys yeboensis Burgeon, 1935 c g
 Tachys yodai Jedlicka, 1964 c g
 Tachys yorkensis Baehr, 2012 c g
 Tachys yunchengensis Kirschenhofer, 1986 c g
 Tachys zonatus Andrewes, 1925 c g
 Tachys zulficari Schatzmayr & Koch, 1934 c g

Data sources: i = ITIS, c = Catalogue of Life, g = GBIF, b = Bugguide.net

References

Tachys